Charles Harlow (February 20, 1903 – November 14, 1986) was an American athlete. He competed in the men's javelin throw at the 1928 Summer Olympics.

References

1903 births
1986 deaths
Athletes (track and field) at the 1928 Summer Olympics
American male javelin throwers
Olympic track and field athletes of the United States
People from Celeste, Texas
Track and field athletes from Texas